Supaul Assembly constituency is an assembly constituency in Supaul district in the Indian state of Bihar.  In 2015 Bihar Legislative Assembly election, Supaul will be one of the 36 seats to have VVPAT enabled electronic voting machines.

Overview
As per Delimitation of Parliamentary and Assembly constituencies Order, 2008, No. 43  Supaul Assembly constituency is composed of the following: Supaul municipality; Gopalpur Sire, Bakaur, Ghuran, Baruari, Pipra Khurd, Ramdatt Patti, Balwa, Karnpur, Laukha, Basbitti, Goth Baruari, Ekma, Balha, Bairo, Sukhpur Solhni, Telwa, Bairiya, Chainsinghpatti, Malhni, Parsarma Parsauni gram panchayats of Supaul community development block; and Marauna CD Block.

Supaul Assembly constituency is part of No. 8 Supaul (Lok Sabha constituency).

Members of Legislative Assembly

^ denotes by-poll

Election results

2020

References

External links
 

Assembly constituencies of Bihar
Politics of Supaul district